Peter John Williams (born 21 October 1931) is an English former professional footballer who played in the Football League as a winger.

References

1931 births
Living people
Footballers from Nottingham
English footballers
Association football wingers
South Normanton Athletic F.C. players
Derby County F.C. players
Boston United F.C. players
Chesterfield F.C. players
Arnold F.C. players
English Football League players